Deegh is a town and a Block (Mandal) in Sant Ravidas Nagar district in the Indian state of Uttar Pradesh.

Villages under Deegh Block

List of villages in Deegh Block
 Amilaur Tari
 Amilaur Uparwar
 Arai Tari N. Baripur
 Arai Uparwar N. Baripur
 Arata
 Arazi Chhatami
 Atibalshah Tari
 Atibalshah Uparwar
 Awapur
 Badaripur Tari
 Badaripur Uparwar
 Badhamana
 Bahapura Tari
 Bahupura Uparwar
 Baikunth Patti Urf Dhanapur
 Bainkunth Patti Urf Sujatpur
 Bairaja
 Balanpur
 Balipur N.Baragaon
 Banaka Tari
 Bankar Tari N. Baripur
 Bankat Khas
 Bankat N.Koirauna
 Bankat Uparwar N. Barpur
 Baragaon
 Baraipur
 Baripur Tari
 Baripuruparwar
 Belhua
 Beraspur Tari
 Berwa Paharpur Tari
 Berwa Paharpur Uparwar
 Bhabhauri Tari
 bhabhauri Uparwar
 Bhagwanpur Chauthar
 Bharatpur Baragaon
 Bhatgavan Tari
 Bhatgavan Uparwar
 Bhavapur N. Baragaon
 Bhikhipur N. Koirauna
 Bhuri Uparwar
 Bhurra Tari
 Bichhiya
 Biharojpur Tari
 Biharojpur Uparwar
 Birnai
 Bitthalpur
 Chain Patti
 Chak Bahattar
 Chak Harnandan
 Chak Jujhari
 Chak Mandhata (Hardevpur)
 Chak Musaha
 Chak Premgiri
 Chak Vijai N. Padauna
 Chakdadu N. Padauna
 Chakia Tari
 Chakia Uparwar
 Chaksada
 Chandapur
 Chatur Seva
 Chhatmi Khas
 Chhechhua Tari
 Chhechhua Uparwar
 Danipatti Tari
 Danipatti Uparwar
 Darwasi
 Dasharam Patti
 Deegh Tari
 Deeghuparwar
 Dhan Tulsi Tari
 Dhan Tulsi Uparwar
 Dhanai Patti
 Dhara Visambhar Patti
 Dodil Patti
 Duguna Tari
 Duguna Uparwar
 Fulwariya Uparwar
 Fulwariyatari
 Gajadharpur Tari N. Ojhapur
 Gajadharpur Uparwar
 Gajadharpur Uparwar N. Ojhapur
 Gambhir Singh Patti
 Gandhi
 Ganga Patti
 Ghana Patti
 Ghanshyampur
 Godhana
 Golekkhara
 Gopalpur Tari
 Gopalpur Tari
 Gopalpur Uparwar
 Gopalpur Uparwar
 Gopi Patti
 Gulauri Tari
 Gulauri Uparwar
 Hari Rampur Tari
 Hari Rampur Uparwar
 Ibrahimpur
 Ibrahimpur Uparwar
 Inargaon
 Itahara Tari
 Itahara Uparwar
 Jaganandan Patti
 Jagapur
 Jagdishpur Tari
 Jagdishpur Uparwar
 Jagdishpur Urf Chhatami
 Jagdishpur Urf Kanthi Patti
 Jajpur
 Jangalpur
 Jodhi Patti
 Jogapur
 Judaupor N.Suryabhanpur
 Kalaka Pura
 Kalanua
 Kalik Mavaiya Tari
 Kalik Mavaiya Uparwar
 Kalika Nagar Koirauna
 Kalinjar Tari
 Kalinjara Uparwar
 Kanchanpur
 Kanthi Patti
 Karbadhiya Tari
 Karvghiya Uparwar
 Kaulapur
 Kedarpur Tari
 Kedarpur Uparwar
 Keshorampur
 Kewatahi
 Khanapur
 Khargapur
 Khedopur N. Koirauna
 Khemapur N. Diha Tari
 Khemapur N. Dihuparwar
 Khorabeer
 Kishun Deopur
 Kormaich
 Kulmanpur
 Kundi Kala Tari
 Kundi Kala Uparwar
 Kundi Khurd Tari
 Kundi Khurd Uparwar
 Kurwauparwar
 Kuthawatari
 Lakhanpur Bhadran Uparwar
 Lakhanpur Bhadraun Tari
 Madanpur
 Madhopur N. Dhonapur
 Mahmadpur Tari
 Mahmadpur Uparwar
 Mahuari
 Mailauna
 Majhagawan
 Manga Patti
 Manshahpur
 Marhachh Tari
 Marhachh Uparwar
 Marsara
 Matukpur
 Mavaiya Than Singh Tari
 Mavaiya Vara Goti Tari
 Mavaiya Vara Goti Uparwar
 Mavaiyat Wansingh Uparwar
 N. Itahara Gajadharpur Tari
 Nabhapur
 Nagardah Tari
 Nagardah Uparwar
 Nanepar Tari
 Narepar Uparwar
 Naudhan
 Neknam Patti
 Ojhapur
 Parasani Tari
 Parasrampur Baragaon
 Parsani Uparwar
 Peraspur Uparwar
 Poore Nagari
 Poore Purwa Tari
 Poore Purwa Uparwar
 Pratap Shahpur
 Prayagdaspur
 Purwa Tari
 Purwa Uparwar
 Raipatti N. Suryabhanpur
 Raiyapur
 Rajmala
 Ramdaspur
 Ramkishunpur Basahi
 Rasapatti
 Sadashiv Patti
 Sagar Raipur
 Sajhara Tari
 Sanaka Uparwar
 Sarai Jagadish
 Saraiya
 Semaradh Tari
 Semradhh Uparwar
 Sewak Patti
 Sherpur Pindara Hissa Urf Joga
 Sherpur Tari
 Sherpur Uparwar
 Sherpur Urf Lachhaman Patti
 Sherpur Urf Vijalepur
 Shivnath Patti
 Shivpur N. Tilanga
 Shivrampur
 Shivrampur N. Tulsipur
 Shivsewak Patti
 Siki Chaura
 Sonaicha
 Sudhavai
 Surajbhanpur
 Suriya
 Tateria
 Terhi Tari
 Terhi Uparwar
 Tikari
 Tilanga
 Tribhuvan Baragaon
 Tribhuwanpur N.Koirauna
 Tulapur Rohi
 Tulsi Kala Tari
 Tulsi Kala Uparwar
 Tulsi Patti
 Tulsipur
 Ullanpur
 Uzmugaraha
 Vairi Veesa
 Vaja Patti
 Vedmanpur
 Vidan Patti
 Vihaspur
 Dhara Visambhar Patti

References

Cities and towns in Bhadohi district